Air Commodore Edward "Teddy" Mortlock Donaldson,  (12 February 1912 – 2 June 1992) was a Royal Air Force (RAF) flying ace of the Second World War, and a former holder of the airspeed world record.

Early life
Born in Negeri Sembilan, then part of British Malaya, his father C.E. Donaldson was a judge. One of four brothers, three of whom would serve as fighter pilots with the RAF and gain the Distinguished Service Order (DSO). Educated in England at the King's School, Rochester and Christ's Hospital, he then studied at McGill University in Canada.

RAF career
Donaldson joined two of his brothers in the RAF in 1931, granted a short service commission his first posting being to No. 3 Squadron flying Bristol Bulldogs.

In 1932 he was runner up in the R.A.F. Wakefield Boxing Championship, which he won the following year. In 1933 the crack-shot won the RAF's Gunnery Trophy One, known as the Brooke-Popham Air Firing Trophy, and won it again in 1934. In 1935 he became a stunt pilot as a member of the No. 3 Squadron aerobatic team of five Bulldogs, which he led in 1937 and 1938 at the International Zürich Rally.

When the Second World War broke out, Squadron Leader Donaldson was commanding No. 151 Squadron flying the Hawker Hurricane. In their first engagement over France, they destroyed six enemy aircraft, shooting down many more in the following months including at the Battle of Dunkirk. For his leadership of the squadron during the battle and his personal tally of eleven kills, plus ten probable destructions, Donaldson was awarded the DSO.

In desperate need for pilots, the RAF choose to transfer Donaldson to the gunnery instructor school. Posted to Canada, Donaldson self-penned an RAF training booklet titled Notes on Air Gunnery and Air Fighting, which after the United States entered the war, provided the basis for his instruction. As liaison to the US Army Air Force, his booklet was replicated over 7,500 times, and helped teach USAAF gunnery instructors.

On his return to England in 1944, he converted to jet aircraft and commanded the first operational Gloster Meteor squadron, at RAF Colerne.

Airspeed record
During the Second World War, most of the pre-war airspeed records had been broken. The RAF decided to recapture the flight airspeed record with its new generation of jet aircraft, and set up a new High Speed Flight squadron. Group Captain Donaldson was selected to command the Air Speed Flight, established at the start of 1946. As a result, he was awarded a Bar to his Air Force Cross.

Later RAF career
During the early 1950s, Donaldson served in West Germany and commanded RAF Fassberg and RAF Wunstorf airfields, gaining appointment to Commander of the Order of the British Empire in June 1953, and advancement to air commodore in July 1955 after attending the Joint Services Staff College. From 1956 to 1958 he served as Deputy Commander of Air Forces in the Arabian Peninsula. On return to England, his final appointment was as Commandant of the RAF College, Manby.

Personal life
Donaldson married Winifred Constant in 1936, and the couple had two daughters. After they were divorced in 1944, in the same year he married Estellee Holland, an American nurse, and the couple had one son, David. After they divorced in 1954, he married Anne Sofie Stapleton in 1957, whom he divorced in 1982.

Donaldson retired as an air commodore in 1961, and became the Air Correspondent for The Daily Telegraph, until 1979. He retired to his home in Selsey, and died at the Royal Naval Hospital Haslar on 6 June 1992. Donaldson is buried at St Andrew's Church, Tangmere.

Memorial

Donaldson was brought up at 86 Grafton Road, Selsey, where during 2000 a blue plaque was placed as part of the Selsey Heritage trail.

Donaldson's medals and flight books were sold at auction for £4,800 in June 2004.

Service history

Combat record
The following table is not complete in numbers or detail.

References

Further reading 
 Thomas, Nick. (2008). RAF Top Gun: The Story of Battle of Britain Ace and World Air Speed Record Holder Air Cdre E.M. 'Teddy' Donaldson CB, CBE, DSO, AFC*. LoM (USA) Pen & Sword Books 

People from Negeri Sembilan
People educated at King's School, Rochester
People educated at Christ's Hospital
McGill University alumni
Royal Air Force officers
The Few
British World War II flying aces
Companions of the Distinguished Service Order
Commanders of the Order of the British Empire
Companions of the Order of the Bath
Foreign recipients of the Legion of Merit
1912 births
1992 deaths
Recipients of the Air Force Cross (United Kingdom)
Britannia Trophy winners
Royal Air Force pilots of World War II
British aviation record holders
People from Selsey
British people in British Malaya
British expatriates in Canada